Patna railway station may refer to:

Patna Junction railway station, a major railway station in Patna, India
Patna Sahib railway station or Patna City, a railway station in Patna, India
Patna railway station (Scotland), a former railway station that served the town of Patna, Scotland